The Invisible Hand is a 1920 American silent Western film serial directed by William Bowman and starring Antonio Moreno, Pauline Curley, Jay Morley, and Brinsley Shaw. The film was released by Vitagraph Company of America in January 1920.

Cast
 Antonio Moreno as John 'The Needle' Sharpe
 Pauline Curley as Ann Crawford aka Violet 'X' Ray
 Jay Morley as Burnett, Chief of the Secret Service
 Brinsley Shaw as The Iron Hand
 George Mellcrest as Potsdam
 Sam Polo as Red Black
 Gordon Sackville
 Charles Rich

Chapter titles
Setting the Snare
TNT
Winged Death
Gassed
Dodging Disaster
The Closing Jaw
The Submarine Cave
Outwitted
A Heathen Sacrifice
Fender of Flesh
Flirting with Death
Dungeon of Despair
Plunging Peril
A Modern Mazeppa
Closing the Net

Preservation
Like most silent film serials, the film is now considered lost.

References

External links

 

1920 Western (genre) films
1920 films
American silent serial films
American black-and-white films
Vitagraph Studios film serials
Lost American films
Silent American Western (genre) films
Films directed by William Bowman
1920s American films
1920s English-language films